Miller Group may refer to:

Miller Group (construction company), transportation construction company based in Markham, Ontario, Canada
Miller Group (marketing agency), based in Los Angeles
Miller Group, property company based in Edinburgh, Scotland, see Miller Homes